Conospermum quadripetalum is a shrub endemic to Western Australia.

It blooms between September and November producing blue-white flowers.

It is found on flats behind coastal hills in two areas along the south coast in the South West and Great Southern regions of Western Australia where it grows in sandy-clay soils.

References

External links

Eudicots of Western Australia
quadripetalum
Endemic flora of Western Australia
Plants described in 1995